Eric Treacy,  (2 June 1907 – 13 May 1978) was an English railway photographer and Anglican bishop.

Early life and education

Born in London, Treacy was educated at Haberdashers' Aske's School and at King's College London, though he left without taking a degree.

Ordained ministry
In 1932 he was ordained deacon in the Church of England and priest a year later, serving as curate at Liverpool parish church from 1932 to 1934. He married Mary Leyland 'May' Treacy (née Shone) (1902-1985), a voluntary social worker, in 1932. He took up railway photography, being inspired by visiting Liverpool Lime Street and getting to know his parishioners who worked on the railway. His photographic work appeared in various magazines during the 1930s.

His photography was interrupted by the Second World War when he served as Military Chaplain. On 12 March 1940, he was commissioned as Chaplain to the Forces 4th Class (equivalent to captain). On 10 May 1945, it was announced that Treacy had been Mentioned in Despatches "in recognition of gallant and distinguished services in North West Europe". He was promoted to a Chaplain to the Forces 3rd Class (equivalent to major). On 24 January 1946, he was appointed a Member of the Order of the British Empire (MBE).

In 1946 Treacy published his first book which contained images of L.M.S. locomotives.  On demobilisation he became Rector of Keighley and in 1949 was appointed Archdeacon of Halifax.

Episcopal ministry
In 1961, Treacy was consecrated a bishop and appointed the Bishop of Pontefract, a suffragan bishop in the Diocese of Wakefield. In 1968, he was made Bishop of Wakefield, the diocesan bishop. He held the post until he retired from full-time ministry in 1976.

Death and commemoration
On 13 May 1978, Treacy died from a heart attack on Appleby Station on the Settle-Carlisle Railway whilst waiting for a railtour hauled by BR 92220 Evening Star. A slate plaque is displayed on the main station building to his memory. He is buried at St Kentigern's Church, Crosthwaite, Keswick. In 1979 LMS Stanier Class 5 4-6-0 number 45428 was named Eric Treacy.

The Treacy Collection of 12,000 photographs forms part of the National Railway Museum's archive of over 1.4 million images.

Selected works
The following are photograph albums of Treacy's work:
 Eric Treacy (1976), Roaming the Northern Rails 
 Eric Treacy (1977), Roaming the East Coast Main Line Ian Allan. 
 Eric Treacy (1969), Lure of Steam Ian Allan , 1980 reprint 
 Eric Treacy (1981, reprint(?) Glory of Steam Ian Allan 
 G. Freeman Allen, (1982), Great Railway Photographs by Eric Treacy Peerage Books, London
 
 P.Whitehouse & J.Powell (1985), Treacy's Routes North
 P.Whitehouse & J.Powell (1990), Treacy's British Rail
 Eric Treacy (1991 reprint), Portrait of Steam 
 Eric Treacy (1994), The Best of Eric Treacy Atlantic Transport Publishers 
 David Jenkinson & Patrick Whitehouse (1988), Eric Treacy's L.M.S. Oxford Publishing Company

References

Further reading
 Peart-Binns, John S. (1980) Eric Treacy, London, Ian Allan Ltd. .

External links

Railway Photographers (steamindex.com)

1907 births
1978 deaths
Alumni of King's College London
Archdeacons of Halifax
Bishops of Pontefract
Bishops of Wakefield (diocese)
Photographers from London
Members of the Order of the British Empire
People educated at Haberdashers' Boys' School
Rail transport photographers
20th-century Church of England bishops
World War II chaplains
British people associated with Heritage Railways
English military chaplains
Royal Army Chaplains' Department officers